André Duval (April 21, 1920 – March 30, 2018) was a French-Canadian author and historian. He was a regular contributor to Revue Sainte Anne, a Catholic magazine.

Novels
 Le mercenaire (1961)
 Les condisciples (1971)

Non-fiction
 Québec romantique (1978)
 La capitale (1979)
 Québec-Boston (1980)
 Dorval: trois siècles d'histoire (1989)
 Mon lac se raconte: Lac Beauport (1983)
 Place Jacques-Cartier (1984)

References

1920 births
2018 deaths
French Quebecers
Writers from Quebec
Canadian writers in French
Université Laval alumni